Senator Humphrey may refer to:

Members of the United States Senate
Gordon J. Humphrey (born 1940), U.S. Senator from New Hampshire from 1979 to 1990
Hubert Humphrey (1911–1978), U.S. Senator from Minnesota from 1971 to 1978

United States state senate members
Friend Humphrey (1787–1854), New York  State Senate
Herman L. Humphrey (1830–1902), Wisconsin State Senate
James M. Humphrey (1819–1899), New York State Senate
John Humphrey (Illinois politician) (1838–1914), Illinois State Senate
Lester H. Humphrey (1850–1902), New York State Senate
Lyman U. Humphrey (1844–1915), Kansas State Senate
Ralph L. Humphrey (1908–1961), Ohio State Senate
Reuben Humphrey (1757–1832), New York State Senate
Skip Humphrey (born 1942), Minnesota State Senate
Wolcott J. Humphrey (1817–1890), New York State Senate

See also
Senator Humphreys (disambiguation)